French football clubs have entered European association football competitions since 1955–56 season, when Reims took part in the inaugural European Cup. Marseille became the first French club to win the UEFA Champions League in 1993, although their win was overshadowed by their president bribing Valencieness players to allow them to win the league in the same. The only other French club to win a major trophy in Europe is Paris Saint-Germain, who won the Cup Winners' Cup in 1996.

Finals

Final appearance by competition

References

 France on www.uefa.com

European football clubs in international competitions
Association football in France lists
 List